Liberty Christian School is a private, college preparatory, Christian school located in Argyle, Texas. Liberty offers Christ-centered education from Preschool (age 3) through Grade 12, and provides state championship programs in academics, fine arts, and athletics.

Liberty Christian is part of the Texas Association of Private and Parochial Schools (TAPPS). Liberty's mascot is the Warrior.  In 2020 the school made headlines when it announced the hiring of former Dallas Cowboys tight end Jason Witten as its head football coach.

Established in 1983, Liberty moved to its current location in Argyle in 2005. It was formerly located in Denton, Texas.

Notable alumni 
Ben Habern
Carson Blair
Luke Kornet  - Power Forward, Boston Celtics
Brad Lundblade - NFL Offensive Lineman for the Seattle Seahawks
Lisa Whelchel - Class of 1980 actress Blair Warner on The Facts of Life (TV series)

References

External links

Christian schools in Texas
Schools in Denton County, Texas
Private K-12 schools in Texas
1983 establishments in Texas
Educational institutions established in 1983